Melitaea abyssinica is a butterfly in the family Nymphalidae. It is found in Ethiopia.

References

Endemic fauna of Ethiopia
Butterflies described in 1909
Melitaea